The 2016 Saint-Martin Senior League was the 45th season of the competition. The championship was won by FC Concordia.

References

Saint Barthélemy Championships
Football competitions in the Collectivity of Saint Martin